Baresan University (BSU) (Arabic: جامعة بريسن, Somali: Jaamacada Bare san) is a private higher education institution which is non-political, non-partisan and non-sectarian. It was established in 2010. Baresan University was established at a time when young Somali secondary graduates could hardly get an opportunity to continue their education after secondary school due to the scarcity of tertiary education institutions in Somalia.

History 
The collapse of the Somali state and the subsequent civil war(s) from 1990s have altered most aspects of Somali lives ; but they have been particularly devastating in the area of education, where an entire generation has lost out on one of the most precious opportunities of childhood and adults. The restoration of regular schooling and universities are critical if Somalis expect to survive the present upheaval and envision a hopeful future.

The scheme to launch Baresan University was advanced by a group of intellectuals led by Dr Abdulrazak Adam Jimale. After more than five years of investigation and consultation the university began at the end of 2010.

Campus 
Baresan University has one campus in Banaadir

Mogadishu campus 
The main campus is located in Mogadishu Banadir.

Academics 
The university offers undergraduate courses in the natural sciences, the social sciences, the Technology and professional studies. Scholarships are available.

The medium of instruction in undergraduate programs is English and Arabic. Applicants are required to pass an English examination if they are from a non-English speaking country. Engalish language support at all levels is provided by the Languages Unit.

Colleges

Economics and Management Science College 
 Faculty of Business Management
 Faculty of Banking & Finance
 Faculty of Accounting
 Faculty of Economics
 Faculty of Marketing
 Faculty of HRM

Agriculture and Vet medicine College 
 Faculty of Agriculture
 Faculty of Veterinary Medicine

Medicine & Health Science College 
 Faculty of Medicine & Surgery
 Faculty of Medical Laboratory
 Faculty of Public Health
 Faculty Of Neuroscience
 Faculty Of Nutrition

Education & Mass Media College 
 Faculty of Education
 Faculty of Journalism

Engineering College 
 Faculty of Computer Science
 Faculty of Civil Engineering

Islamic Studies College 
 Faculty of Sharia & Law

Languages College 
 Faculty of Arabic Language
 Faculty of English Literature

References

External links

 Official website

Universities in Somalia
Lower Shabelle
Educational institutions established in 2010
2010 establishments in Somalia
Universities in Mogadishu